Naturally occurring lanthanum (57La) is composed of one stable (139La) and one radioactive (138La) isotope, with the stable isotope, 139La, being the most abundant (99.91% natural abundance). There are 38 radioisotopes that have been characterized, with the most stable being 138La, with a half-life of 1.02×1011 years; 137La, with a half-life of 60,000 years and 140La, with a half-life of 1.6781 days. The remaining radioactive isotopes have half-lives that are less than a day and the majority of these have half-lives that are less than 1 minute. This element also has 12 nuclear isomers, the longest-lived of which is 132mLa, with a half-life of 24.3 minutes.

The isotopes of lanthanum range in atomic weight from 116.95 u (117La) to 154.96 u (155La).

List of isotopes 

|-
| rowspan=2|117La
| rowspan=2 style="text-align:right" | 57
| rowspan=2 style="text-align:right" | 60
| rowspan=2|116.95007(43)#
| rowspan=2|23.5(26) ms
| β+
| 117Ba
| rowspan=2|(3/2+, 3/2−)
| rowspan=2|
| rowspan=2|
|-
| p
| 116Ba
|-
| style="text-indent:1em" | 117mLa
| colspan="3" style="text-indent:2em" | 151(12) keV
| 10(5) ms
|
|
| (9/2+)
|
|
|-
| 118La
| style="text-align:right" | 57
| style="text-align:right" | 61
| 117.94673(32)#
| 200# ms
| β+
| 118Ba
|
|
|
|-
| 119La
| style="text-align:right" | 57
| style="text-align:right" | 62
| 118.94099(43)#
| 1# s
| β+
| 119Ba
| 11/2−#
|
|
|-
| rowspan=2|120La
| rowspan=2 style="text-align:right" | 57
| rowspan=2 style="text-align:right" | 63
| rowspan=2|119.93807(54)#
| rowspan=2|2.8(2) s
| β+
| 120Ba
| rowspan=2|
| rowspan=2|
| rowspan=2|
|-
| β+, p
| 119Cs
|-
| rowspan=2|121La
| rowspan=2 style="text-align:right" | 57
| rowspan=2 style="text-align:right" | 64
| rowspan=2|120.93301(54)#
| rowspan=2|5.3(2) s
| β+
| 121Ba
| rowspan=2|11/2−#
| rowspan=2|
| rowspan=2|
|-
| β+, p
| 120Cs
|-
| rowspan=2|122La
| rowspan=2 style="text-align:right" | 57
| rowspan=2 style="text-align:right" | 65
| rowspan=2|121.93071(32)#
| rowspan=2|8.6(5) s
| β+
| 122Ba
| rowspan=2|
| rowspan=2|
| rowspan=2|
|-
| β+, p
| 121Cs
|-
| 123La
| style="text-align:right" | 57
| style="text-align:right" | 66
| 122.92624(21)#
| 17(3) s
| β+
| 123Ba
| 11/2−#
|
|
|-
| 124La
| style="text-align:right" | 57
| style="text-align:right" | 67
| 123.92457(6)
| 29.21(17) s
| β+
| 124Ba
| (7−, 8−)
|
|
|-
| style="text-indent:1em" | 124mLa
| colspan="3" style="text-indent:2em" | 100(100)# keV
| 21(4) s
|
|
| low(+#)
|
|
|-
| 125La
| style="text-align:right" | 57
| style="text-align:right" | 68
| 124.920816(28)
| 64.8(12) s
| β+
| 125Ba
| (11/2−)
|
|
|-
| style="text-indent:1em" | 125mLa
| colspan="3" style="text-indent:2em" | 107.0(10) keV
| 390(40) ms
|
|
| (3/2+)
|
|
|-
| 126La
| style="text-align:right" | 57
| style="text-align:right" | 69
| 125.91951(10)
| 54(2) s
| β+
| 126Ba
| (5)(+#)
|
|
|-
| style="text-indent:1em" | 126mLa
| colspan="3" style="text-indent:2em" | 210(410) keV
| 20(20) s
|
|
| (0−, 1−, 2−)
|
|
|-
| 127La
| style="text-align:right" | 57
| style="text-align:right" | 70
| 126.916375(28)
| 5.1(1) min
| β+
| 127Ba
| (11/2−)
|
|
|-
| rowspan=2 style="text-indent:1em" | 127mLa
| rowspan=2 colspan="3" style="text-indent:2em" | 14.8(12) keV
| rowspan=2|3.7(4) min
| β+
| 127Ba
| rowspan=2|(3/2+)
| rowspan=2|
| rowspan=2|
|-
| IT
| 127La
|-
| 128La
| style="text-align:right" | 57
| style="text-align:right" | 71
| 127.91559(6)
| 5.18(14) min
| β+
| 128Ba
| (5+)
|
|
|-
| style="text-indent:1em" | 128mLa
| colspan="3" style="text-indent:2em" | 100(100)# keV
| <1.4 min
| IT
| 128La
| (1+, 2−)
|
|
|-
| 129La
| style="text-align:right" | 57
| style="text-align:right" | 72
| 128.912693(22)
| 11.6(2) min
| β+
| 129Ba
| 3/2+
|
|
|-
| style="text-indent:1em" | 129mLa
| colspan="3" style="text-indent:2em" | 172.1(4) keV
| 560(50) ms
| IT
| 129La
| 11/2−
|
|
|-
| 130La
| style="text-align:right" | 57
| style="text-align:right" | 73
| 129.912369(28)
| 8.7(1) min
| β+
| 130Ba
| 3(+)
|
|
|-
| 131La
| style="text-align:right" | 57
| style="text-align:right" | 74
| 130.91007(3)
| 59(2) min
| β+
| 131Ba
| 3/2+
|
|
|-
| style="text-indent:1em" | 131mLa
| colspan="3" style="text-indent:2em" | 304.52(24) keV
| 170(10) μs
|
|
| 11/2−
|
|
|-
| 132La
| style="text-align:right" | 57
| style="text-align:right" | 75
| 131.91010(4)
| 4.8(2) h
| β+
| 132Ba
| 2−
|
|
|-
| rowspan=2 style="text-indent:1em" | 132mLa
| rowspan=2 colspan="3" style="text-indent:2em" | 188.18(11) keV
| rowspan=2|24.3(5) min
| IT (76%)
| 132La
| rowspan=2|6−
| rowspan=2|
| rowspan=2|
|-
| β+ (24%)
| 132Ba
|-
| 133La
| style="text-align:right" | 57
| style="text-align:right" | 76
| 132.90822(3)
| 3.912(8) h
| β+
| 133Ba
| 5/2+
|
|
|-
| 134La
| style="text-align:right" | 57
| style="text-align:right" | 77
| 133.908514(21)
| 6.45(16) min
| β+
| 134Ba
| 1+
|
|
|-
| 135La
| style="text-align:right" | 57
| style="text-align:right" | 78
| 134.906977(11)
| 19.5(2) h
| β+
| 135Ba
| 5/2+
|
|
|-
| 136La
| style="text-align:right" | 57
| style="text-align:right" | 79
| 135.90764(6)
| 9.87(3) min
| β+
| 136Ba
| 1+
|
|
|-
| style="text-indent:1em" | 136mLa
| colspan="3" style="text-indent:2em" | 255(9) keV
| 114(3) ms
| IT
| 136La
| (8)(−#)
|
|
|-
| 137La
| style="text-align:right" | 57
| style="text-align:right" | 80
| 136.906494(14)
| 6(2)×104 y
| EC
| 137Ba
| 7/2+
|
|
| extinct
|-
| rowspan=2|138La
| rowspan=2 style="text-align:right" | 57
| rowspan=2 style="text-align:right" | 81
| rowspan=2|137.907112(4)
| rowspan=2|1.02(1)×1011 y
| β+ (66.4%)
| 138Ba
| rowspan=2|5+
| rowspan=2|9.0(1)×10−4
| rowspan=2|
|-
| β− (33.6%)
| 138Ce
|-
| style="text-indent:1em" | 138mLa
| colspan="3" style="text-indent:2em" | 72.57(3) keV
| 116(5) ns
|
|
| (3)+
|
|
|-
| 139La
| style="text-align:right" | 57
| style="text-align:right" | 82
| 138.9063533(26)
| colspan=3 align=center|Stable
| 7/2+
| 0.99910(1)
|
|-
| 140La
| style="text-align:right" | 57
| style="text-align:right" | 83
| 139.9094776(26)
| 1.6781(3) d
| β−
| 140Ce
| 3−
|
|
|-
| 141La
| style="text-align:right" | 57
| style="text-align:right" | 84
| 140.910962(5)
| 3.92(3) h
| β−
| 141Ce
| (7/2+)
|
|
|-
| 142La
| style="text-align:right" | 57
| style="text-align:right" | 85
| 141.914079(6)
| 91.1(5) min
| β−
| 142Ce
| 2−
|
|
|-
| 143La
| style="text-align:right" | 57
| style="text-align:right" | 86
| 142.916063(17)
| 14.2(1) min
| β−
| 143Ce
| (7/2)+
|
|
|-
| 144La
| style="text-align:right" | 57
| style="text-align:right" | 87
| 143.91960(5)
| 40.8(4) s
| β−
| 144Ce
| (3−)
|
|
|-
| 145La
| style="text-align:right" | 57
| style="text-align:right" | 88
| 144.92165(10)
| 24.8(20) s
| β−
| 145Ce
| (5/2+)
|
|
|-
| rowspan=2|146La
| rowspan=2 style="text-align:right" | 57
| rowspan=2 style="text-align:right" | 89
| rowspan=2|145.92579(8)
| rowspan=2|6.27(10) s
| β− (99.99%)
| 146Ce
| rowspan=2|2−
| rowspan=2|
| rowspan=2|
|-
| β−, n (.007%)
| 145Ce
|-
| style="text-indent:1em" | 146mLa
| colspan="3" style="text-indent:2em" | 130(130) keV
| 10.0(1) s
| β−
| 146Ce
| (6−)
|
|
|-
| rowspan=2|147La
| rowspan=2 style="text-align:right" | 57
| rowspan=2 style="text-align:right" | 90
| rowspan=2|146.92824(5)
| rowspan=2|4.015(8) s
| β− (99.96%)
| 147Ce
| rowspan=2|(5/2+)
| rowspan=2|
| rowspan=2|
|-
| β−, n (.04%)
| 146Ce
|-
| rowspan=2|148La
| rowspan=2 style="text-align:right" | 57
| rowspan=2 style="text-align:right" | 91
| rowspan=2|147.93223(6)
| rowspan=2|1.26(8) s
| β− (99.85%)
| 148Ce
| rowspan=2|(2−)
| rowspan=2|
| rowspan=2|
|-
| β−, n (.15%)
| 147Ce
|-
| rowspan=2|149La
| rowspan=2 style="text-align:right" | 57
| rowspan=2 style="text-align:right" | 92
| rowspan=2|148.93473(34)#
| rowspan=2|1.05(3) s
| β− (98.6%)
| 149Ce
| rowspan=2|5/2+#
| rowspan=2|
| rowspan=2|
|-
| β−, n (1.4%)
| 148Ce
|-
| rowspan=2|150La
| rowspan=2 style="text-align:right" | 57
| rowspan=2 style="text-align:right" | 93
| rowspan=2|149.93877(43)#
| rowspan=2|510(30) ms
| β− (97.3%)
| 150Ce
| rowspan=2|(3+)
| rowspan=2|
| rowspan=2|
|-
| β−, n (2.7%)
| 149Ce
|-
| 151La
| style="text-align:right" | 57
| style="text-align:right" | 94
| 150.94172(43)#
| 300# ms [>300 ns]
| β−
| 151Ce
| 5/2+#
|
|
|-
| 152La
| style="text-align:right" | 57
| style="text-align:right" | 95
| 151.94625(43)#
| 200# ms [>300 ns]
| β−
| 152Ce
|
|
|
|-
| 153La
| style="text-align:right" | 57
| style="text-align:right" | 96
| 152.94962(64)#
| 150# ms [>300 ns]
| β−
| 153Ce
| 5/2+#
|
|
|-
| 154La
| style="text-align:right" | 57
| style="text-align:right" | 97
| 153.95450(64)#
| 100# ms
| β−
| 154Ce
|
|
|
|-
| 155La
| style="text-align:right" | 57
| style="text-align:right" | 98
| 154.95835(86)#
| 60# ms
| β−
| 155Ce
| 5/2+#
|
|

References 

 Isotope masses from:

 Isotopic compositions and standard atomic masses from:

 Half-life, spin, and isomer data selected from the following sources.

 
Lanthanum
Lanthanum